The Long and the Short and the Tall is a play written by British playwright Willis Hall. Set in the Second World War, the play premiered at the Royal Court Theatre in London in January 1959; it was directed by Lindsay Anderson and starred Peter O'Toole and Robert Shaw. It was Anderson's first major production for the Royal Court, transferring to London's West End in April 1959.

The play's name comes from the lyrics of the 1917 song "Bless 'Em All".

A film adaptation was released in 1961. Directed by Leslie Norman, it stars Laurence Harvey, Richard Harris, Richard Todd and David McCallum. A TV drama followed in 1979 which starred Michael Kitchen, Mark McManus and Richard Morant.

Plot
The play is set in British Malaya in 1942, during the Battle of Malaya. The characters are a patrol of British Army soldiers; the play's events take place in an abandoned hut in the middle of the Malayan jungle. Tension rises as the patrol's radio malfunctions and a Japanese soldier stumbles upon them.

Characters / cast
 Sergeant R. 'Mitch' Mitchem - The leader of the patrol, tough and experienced (Robert Shaw)
 Corporal Edward (Ted) 'Johnno' Johnstone - The second-in-command, as tough and experienced as Mitchem, but far more callous (Edward Judd)
 Lance-Corporal A. J. 'Mac' Macleish - A Scotsman, recently made up to lance-corporal, but has no more experience than the privates (none of whom have seen action), intelligent, short-tempered and moral (Ronald Fraser)
 Private C. 'Bammo' Bamforth - A Londoner, witty, rebellious and hates authority, a classic barrack-room lawyer (Peter O'Toole)
 Private T. E. 'Taff' Evans - A Welshman, pleasant and easy-going (Alfred Lynch)
 Private P. 'Smudger' Smith - A Northerner, a quiet, family man (Bryan Pringle)
 Private Samuel 'Sammy' Whitaker -  A Geordie, the youngest member of the patrol and its radio operator, very nervy (David Andrews)
 Japanese Soldier -  Doesn't speak at any point during the play, but still plays a major role (Kenji Takaki)

Albert Finney was originally cast as the North Country Private Bamforth but due to appendicitis he was replaced by the then unknown O'Toole, who turned the character into a Cockney.  O'Toole's understudy (who never went on) was Michael Caine. Caine later played O'Toole's role on a Scottish tour of the play with Frank Finlay as Sergeant Mitchem and Terence Stamp as Whitaker.

Television adaptation
A 30 minute excerpt of the play was filmed for British TV in 1959 with the play's original cast.

References

1959 plays
British plays